SB-408124 is a drug which is a non-peptide antagonist selective for the orexin receptor subtype OX1, with around 70x selectivity for OX1 over OX2 receptors, and improved oral bioavailability compared to the older OX1 antagonist SB-334867. It is used in scientific research into the function of orexinergic neurons in the body.

References 

Orexin antagonists
Fluoroarenes
Quinolines
Sedatives
Ureas